Jan Heřman (born February 16, 1984) is a Czech professional ice hockey player. He played with HC Plzeň in the Czech Extraliga during the 2010–11 season.

Heřman previously played for HC Sareza Ostrava, HC Berounští Medvědi, SK Horácká Slavia Třebíč, and HC Slovan Ústečtí Lvi.

References

External links 
 
 

1984 births
Living people
Czech ice hockey forwards
HC Plzeň players
Sportspeople from Plzeň
Sportovní Klub Kadaň players
HC Karlovy Vary players
HC Slovan Ústečtí Lvi players
HC Berounští Medvědi players
HC RT Torax Poruba players
SK Horácká Slavia Třebíč players
HC Most players
MsHK Žilina players
Czech expatriate ice hockey players in Germany
Czech expatriate ice hockey players in Slovakia